The Prince of Homburg, or in German Der Prinz von Homburg or Prinz Friedrich von Homburg, can refer to the following:

People
Frederick II, Landgrave of Hesse-Homburg (1633–1708), also known as Prince Friedrich of Homburg (Prinz Friedrich von Homburg)

Artistic works
The Prince of Homburg (play) (Prinz Friedrich von Homburg, or in full Prinz Friedrich von Homburg oder die Schlacht bei Fehrbellin), a play written 1809/10 by Heinrich von Kleist about the above
Der Prinz von Homburg (opera), an opera by Hans Werner Henze, written 1958
The Prince of Homburg (film), a film by Marco Bellocchio, made 1997